Lester Kluever (February 29, 1920 – February 18, 1991) was an American politician who served in the Iowa House of Representatives from the 30th district from 1957 to 1971.

He died of a heart attack on February 18, 1991, in Atlantic, Iowa at age 70.

References

1920 births
1991 deaths
Republican Party members of the Iowa House of Representatives